Custodian may refer to:

Occupations
 Janitor, a person who cleans and maintains buildings
 Goalkeeper, in association football
 Fullback, in rugby, also called a sweeper
 Legal guardian or conservator, who may be called a custodian in some jurisdictions

Religion
A religious term for an ordained Roman Catholic Priest
 Custodian of the Holy Land (i.e., Custos), an appointed ecclesiastical office in the Franciscan Order,
 Custodian of the Two Holy Mosques, the official title of the head of Saudi Arabia, where the two holiest mosques of Islam are located
 Hashemite custodianship of Jerusalem holy sites, a role claimed by Jordan in administering Jerusalem's holy sites

Other
 Custodian bank, an organization responsible for safeguarding a firm's or individual's financial assets
 Custodian helmet, the helmet worn by many members of the British Police Force
 Clean-up crew in a terrarium
 The Custodian, a 1993 Australian film

See also
 Custody (disambiguation)